The 1992 Marlboro Masters of Formula 3 was the second Masters of Formula 3 race held at Circuit Park Zandvoort on 2 August 1992. It was won by Pedro Lamy, for Opel Team WTS.

Drivers and teams

Classification

Qualifying

Race

References

Masters of Formula Three
Masters of Formula Three
Masters
Masters of Formula Three